Vicki Vomit (born Jens Hellmann, July 9, 1963, Trusetal) is a German satirical musician and comedian. He lives in Erfurt. He is the cousin of Tamara Danz. He was a member of the German heavy metal Band "Blitzz" , who released just one Album (Do the Blitzz) with Steamhammer/SPV in 1989.

Albums
1994: Ein Schritt nach vorn
1996: Ich mach's für Geld
1996: Die fäkalischen Verse
1997: Bumm Bumm
1998: Kuschelpunk 5
2001: Ficken für Deutschland
2001: Wir bekommen ein Ei
2003: Wollmonster
2005: Doomjazz (2 disc)
2006: Für'n Appel und 'n Ei
2011: Für weniger als wie für 'n Appel und 'n Ei
2012: Ich freu mich wie 'n Pferd
2013: STRC - PRST - SKRZ - KRK!

DVDs
2004: Vicki Vomit – Live
2007: Die Globale Erwärmung - unser Weg aus der Krise
2008 Diplomkomiker
2012 Zwanzig Jahre Unfug

External links
 Official Website

Living people
1963 births
German satirists
German comedy musicians